Territory of modern-day Croatia is divided between 7 eparchies of the Serbian Orthodox Church. 5 of them have their seat in Croatia, one in Serbia and one in Bosnia and Herzegovina. As of March 2021 the central public Records of Religious Communities in the Republic of Croatia listed 431 "organizational units" of the Serbian Orthodox Church in Croatia, many of which are local parishes with their own churches. Protection of the properties of cultural importance is  among other general provisions defined by the Agreement between the Republic of Croatia and the Serbian Orthodox Church in the Republic of Croatia.

This is a list of churches categorized according to eparchy;

List per Eparchy

Metropolitanate of Zagreb and Ljubljana

Metropolitanate of Zagreb and Ljubljana is one of the three Metropolitanates of the Serbian Orthodox Church. Its seat is located in Zagreb.
Serbian Orthodox Cathedral, Zagreb (Metropolitanate's cathedral)
Church of St. George, Grubišno Polje
Church of St. George, Varaždin
Church of St. George, Veliki Poganac
Church of the Nativity of the Theotokos, Mali Zdenci
Church of Lazarus of the Four Days, Plavšinac
Church of St. George, Kutinica, Krajiška Kutinica
Church of St. Nicolas, Velika Bršljanica
Church of St. Demetrius, Stupovača

Eparchy of Dalmatia
Eparchy of Dalmatia
Cathedral of the Dormition of the Theotokos, Šibenik (Eparchy's cathedral)
Church of St. Nicholas, Vrlika
Orthodox church of Holy Salvation, Cetina
Church of the Intercession of the Theotokos, Knin

Eparchy of Gornji Karlovac

Church of St. Nicholas, Karlovac (Eparchy's cathedral)
St. Spyridon Church, Peroj
Church of St. Nicholas, Rijeka
Church of St. Peter and Paul, Tepljuh
Church of the Nativity of the Virgin, Drežnica
Church of the Holy Apostles Peter and Paul, Štikada
Church of Saint Parascheva, Slabinja
Orthodox Church in Obljaj, Veliki Obljaj

Eparchy of Osječko polje and Baranja
Alphabetical list (per settlement) of churches within the Eparchy of Osječko polje and Baranja;

 Church of the Saint Archangel Michael, Beli Manastir
 Church of the Transfer of the relics of the Holy Father Nicholas, Bijelo Brdo
 Church of the Dormition of the Theotokos, Bijelo Brdo
 Church of St. George, Bobota
 Church of St. Peter and Paul, Bolman
 Church of St. Stephen, Borovo
 Church of St. Stefan Dečanski, Borovo Naselje
 Church of the Transfer of the relics of the Holy Father Nicholas, Branjina
 Church of the Saint Archangel Gabriel, Bršadin
 Church of the Transfiguration of the Lord, Budimci
 Church of the Presentation of Mary, Čakovci
 Church of the Saint Archangel Michael, Čepin (destroyed in 1992)
 Church of St. Demetrius, Dalj (Eparchy's cathedral)
 Church of the Saint Archangel Michael, Darda
 Church of the Saint Archangel Gabriel, Erdut
 Church of the Nativity of the Theotokos, Gaboš
 Church of St. Nicholas, Jagodnjak
 Church of St. Stefan Štiljanović, Karanac
 Church of the Presentation of Mary, Kneževi Vinogradi
 Church of St. George, Kneževo
 Church of St. George, Marinci
 Church of Pentecost, Markušica
 Church of St. Nicholas, Mikluševci
 Church of St. Nicholas, Mirkovci
 Church of St. Panteleimon, Mirkovci
 Church of the Transfiguration of the Lord, Mohovo
 Church of the Dormition of the Theotokos, Negoslavci
 Church of St. Elijah, Novi Jankovci
 Church of St. George, Opatovac
 Church of St. Peter and Paul, Orolik
 Church of the Dormition of the Mother of God, Osijek
 Church of the Nativity of Saint John the Baptist, Ostrovo
 Church of the Nativity of the Theotokos, Petrova Slatina
 Church of the Transfiguration of the Lord, Petrovci
 Church of the Presentation of Mary, Popovac
 Church of Saint Procopius, Rajevo Selo
 Church of St. Elijah, Silaš
 Church of St. Nicholas, Sotin
 Church of the Nativity of the Theotokos, Srijemske Laze
 Church of the Transfiguration of the Lord, Šarengrad
 Church of St. Nicholas, Tenja
 Church of the Transfiguration of the Lord, Trpinja
 Church of the Nativity of the Theotokos, Vera
 Church of Pentecost, Vinkovci
 Church of St. Peter and Paul, Vladislavci
 Church of St Nicholas, Vukovar
 Church of the Holy Venerable Mother Parascheva, Vukovar
 Church of St. Elijah, Uglješ (in construction)
 Monastery of the Assumption of the Most Holy Mother of God in Dalj Planina

Eparchy of Slavonia
Eparchy of Slavonia
Jasenovac Monastery, Jasenovac (de jure Eparchy's cathedral)
Church of the Holy Trinity, Pakrac, Pakrac (de facto Eparchy's cathedral)

Eparchy of Srem
Only a smaller part of the Eparchy of Srem is located within the boundaries of modern-day Croatia.
Church of the Holy Venerable Mother Parascheva, Banovci
Church of St. George, Tovarnik
Church of the Saint Archangel Michael, Ilok

Eparchy of Zahumlje and Herzegovina

Only a smaller part of the Eparchy of Zahumlje and Herzegovina is located within the boundaries of modern-day Croatia.
Church of the Holy Annunciation, Dubrovnik

References

Serbian Orthodox churches